John Scott (1822 – May 1, 1857) was the first mayor of Bytown, later Ottawa, in 1847. He also served a second term as mayor in 1850. He concurrently served in the Legislative Assembly of the Province of Canada representing Bytown from 1848 to 1851.

He was born in Brockville, Ontario in 1822. He studied law in Toronto and was called to the bar in the early 1840s. He came to Bytown to practice law in 1845.

Scott married Nancy Louisa Wright (1830–1901), daughter of Tiberuis Wright and Lois Ricker and a granddaughter of Philemon Wright, in 1850. By the 1850s Scott moved to Goderich, Ontario where he served as county judge, died in New York City and buried in Hull, Quebec.

References

Mayors of Bytown
1822 births
1857 deaths
Members of the Legislative Assembly of the Province of Canada from Canada West
People from Brockville